Rašovice may refer to places in the Czech Republic:

Rašovice (Kutná Hora District), a municipality and village in the Central Bohemian Region
Rašovice (Vyškov District), a municipality and village in the South Moravian Region
Rašovice, a village and part of Hlasivo in the South Bohemian Region
Rašovice, a village and part of Klášterec nad Ohří in the Ústí nad Labem Region
Rašovice, a village and part of Úštěk in the Ústí nad Labem Region
Rašovice, a village and part of Týniště nad Orlicí in the Hradec Králové Region